Pyramiden is a mountain in King Frederick VI Coast, Kujalleq municipality, southern Greenland.

Geography
This mountain is a 1,410 m high largely unglaciated rocky pyramidal peak rising from a nunatak located above the glacier that joins the confluence at the head of Anorituup Kangerlua fjord from the east.

See also
 List of mountains in Greenland
 List of nunataks of Greenland

References

Mountains of Greenland
Nunataks of Greenland
Kujalleq

ceb:Pyramiden (nunatak sa Greenland, Kujalleq)
sv:Pyramiden (nunatak i Grönland, Kujalleq)